Dylan Michael Patton (born July 13, 1992) is an American former actor and former child model. He is best known for portraying the role of Will Horton on the NBC soap opera Days of Our Lives from February 27, 2009, to January 20, 2010.

He currently plays Ultimate Frisbee for the Los Angeles Organization of Ultimate Teams called Kong and does production assistant work in art department.

Career 

In early 2009 he was cast in the role of Will Horton on the NBC soap opera "Days of Our Lives for 4 years, but due to the change in story line, after playing the role for eleven and a half months, the role was recast and he was let go from the show. In 2010, he was nominated for an award at the 37th annual Daytime Emmy Awards in the Outstanding Younger Actor category for his role on Days.

Personal life
Patton was born in Texas, United States on July 13, 1992. His family consists of his parents David Patton, Deborah Patton and younger brother Julian. He studied at Agoura High School. He spent his youngest years in Texas, then moved to Los Angeles to pursue his acting career. On May 14, 2013, Patton was arrested for selling cocaine out of his parents' Agoura Hills home in California, and on June 13, 2013, he was sentenced to three years probation after pleading no contest.

Awards and nominations

Nominations 
2008
 Young Artist Awards (Cold Case)

2010
 Daytime Emmy Awards (Days of Our Lives)

2011
 Young Artist Awards (Days of Our Lives)

Filmography

References

External links 

1992 births
Male actors from Texas
American male child actors
American male film actors
Male models from Texas
American male television actors
Living people
Drug dealers